Kenichi Ogata may refer to:

Kenichi Ogata (shoot boxer) (born 1975), Japanese kickboxer
Kenichi Ogata (voice actor) (born 1942), Japanese voice actor